Baublitz Commercial Airport  is a public-use general aviation airport located 1 mile South of Brogue, Pennsylvania. The airport opened in 1958, but only became public-use in the 1970s.

Incidents
In November of 2019, a 1946 Luscombe aircraft crashed in a field 0.5 miles away from the airport. The owner of the plane – who was uninjured in the crash – disappeared shortly thereafter, although the owner of the plane was later identified by the FAA.

References

Airports in Pennsylvania